Porog is a rural locality (a selo) and the administrative center of Porozhskoye Rural Settlement of Onezhsky District, Arkhangelsk Oblast, Russia. The population was 532 as of 2010. There are 9 streets.

Geography 
Porog is located on the Onega River, 25 km southeast of Onega (the district's administrative centre) by road. Pavlovskaya is the nearest rural locality.

References 

Rural localities in Onezhsky District
Onezhsky Uyezd